Cannaphila is a small Neotropical genus of dragonflies in the family Libellulidae. They are commonly called narrow-winged skimmers. One species, C. insularis, occurs in North America. There are three species.

Species
Species include:

References

Libellulidae
Anisoptera genera
Odonata of North America
Odonata of South America
Insects of Central America
Insects of the United States
Taxa named by William Forsell Kirby